Leonard Eugene Alley (born July 10, 1940) is an American former professional baseball player. He played his entire career in Major League Baseball as a shortstop for the Pittsburgh Pirates from  through .

Alley was a modest hitter but an exceptionally steady shortstop with good range and an accurate throwing arm. He won two Gold Glove Awards at shortstop (1966–67) and garnered two All-Star appearances primarily on the strength of his glove. He spent most of his career turning double plays with Baseball Hall of Fame second baseman Bill Mazeroski, and the duo set an MLB record of 161 double plays in a season in 1966 that still stands (when the Pirates set a National League record with 215 total double plays).  They also joined a select list of eight shortstop-second baseman duos to each win a Gold Glove the same season while playing together twice (1967–68).  Shoulder and knee problems ultimately ended his career and prevented him from realizing his full potential.

On September 2, 1970, Alley hit an inside-the-park grand slam at Jarry Park Stadium in Montreal, against the Montreal Expos. With the bases loaded, facing Carl Morton, Alley hit a line drive which landed in front of center fielder Boots Day, who slipped on the wet grass. The ball rolled all the way to the wall in deepest center field, and all the baserunners and Alley scored.

In 1998, Alley was inducted into the Virginia Sports Hall of Fame.

See also
List of Gold Glove middle infield duos
List of Major League Baseball players who spent their entire career with one franchise

External links

 Gene Alley at SABR (Baseball BioProject)

1940 births
Living people
Major League Baseball shortstops
Baseball players from Richmond, Virginia
Pittsburgh Pirates players
National League All-Stars
Gold Glove Award winners